Bon Bon Buddy (The Chocolate Drop) is a popular song, first published in 1907, with lyrics by Alex Rogers and music by Will Marion Cook. It was introduced in the 1908 musical Bandanna Land. Today the best-known versions of the largely forgotten song are by Billy Murray, who recorded versions in 1908 on both Victor Records and Indestructible Records.

See also
1907 in music
1908 in music

External links

 Recorded version by Billy Murray at the Internet Archive 

1907 songs
Billy Murray (singer) songs